Irene is a 1926 American silent romantic comedy film starring Colleen Moore, and partially shot in Technicolor. The film was directed by Alfred E. Green, produced by Moore's husband John McCormick, and based on the musical  Irene written by James Montgomery with music and lyrics by Harry Tierney and Joseph McCarthy.

As reported in the book and documentary film The Celluloid Closet, actor George K. Arthur plays a flamboyant gay man in the film named "Madame Lucy".

Cast

Production
The scenes which were shot in Technicolor cost a total amount of $100,000. The total budget of the film was $1,500,000.

This was the fourth of five films, in three years, with Moore and Hughes starring in the lead roles. They also appeared together in The Huntress (1923), Sally (1925), The Desert Flower (1925) and Ella Cinders (1926).

This was the final film of actress Marion Aye, who started appearing on film in 1919 as one of the uncredited Sennett Bathing Beauties. She continued to work in vaudeville and committed suicide in 1951.

Preservation status
The film exists with the Technicolor sequences intact.

See also
List of early color feature films

References

Bibliography
Jeff Codori (2012), Colleen Moore; A Biography of the Silent Film Star, McFarland Publishing, (Print , EBook ).

External links

Color lobby poster
Stills of Colleen Moore (1900 - 1988) at virtual-history.com
 (from a Russian print)

1926 films
1926 romantic comedy films
1920s color films
American romantic comedy films
American silent feature films
American films based on plays
First National Pictures films
Silent films in color
Films directed by Alfred E. Green
Surviving American silent films
1920s American films
Silent romantic comedy films
Silent American comedy films